Różaniec may refer to the following places in Poland:
Różaniec, Lower Silesian Voivodeship (south-west Poland)
Różaniec, Lublin Voivodeship (east Poland)
Różaniec, Gmina Braniewo in Warmian-Masurian Voivodeship (north Poland)
Różaniec, Gmina Pieniężno in Warmian-Masurian Voivodeship (north Poland)